Liao Xiaoyi, or Sheri Liao, is a Chinese environmental activist, journalist and producer of documentaries whose works are credited with advancing the Chinese environmental movement.

Life and work

After graduating from Sun Yat-sen University in 1986, Liao taught philosophy as a researcher at the Chinese Academy of Social Sciences, where she first gained an interest in environmental philosophy. She began to read environmentalist works and film documentaries on China's ecological plight that appeared on China Central Television. She then served as a visiting scholar at the University of North Carolina, where she claims to have first discovered the role that civil society can play in environmentalism. She returned to China in 1996 and founded the non-government organization Global Village of Beijing.

Her idea is to promote "a life of harmony" through reduced consumption and decreased use of harmful practices in daily lives. She served as an environmental adviser on the Beijing Organizing Committee for the 2008 Olympic Games. Through her role as president of Global Village of Beijing, she has produced models for green neighborhood complexes, rural communities, and organized many public awareness campaigns regarding pollution, recycling and reducing consumption.

Awards and honors
 2009: Featured as "Hero of the Environment" by TIME magazine, USA
 2008: the Third Annual Happy "Town Provisions" Person of the Year by CCTV
 2008: Most influential Charity Project Award by Ministry of Civil Affairs
 2008: the 30 Years of Reform and Opening Up award by People's Daily
 2008: Individual Contribution Award issued by National Commission for Development and Reform
 2008: Global Citizen Award by Clinton Global Initiative, USA
 2007: Ecological person of the year award by a joint committee of six Ministries led by Ministry of Agriculture
 2006: Green Person of the year award for environmental achievement by Joint committee of seven Ministries led by Ministry of Environment
 2005: Person of the year award for economic public charity. CCTV
 2002: Ten Outstanding Women in China by the magazine Chinese Women
 2001: Banksias Award, Australia
 2000: Sophie Prize, Norway

See also
 Environmentalism
 Global Village of Beijing
 Women and the environment through history

Notes

External links
Sheri Liao, Philosopher - Time magazine article, from Heroes of the Environment,
By Jessie Jiang/ Beijing, Tuesday, Sep. 22, 2009
Global Village of Beijing - The official website of Liao Xiaoyi's environmental NGO

People's Republic of China philosophers
Chinese tai chi practitioners
Chinese activists
Chinese women activists
Educators from Chongqing
Chinese film producers
Chinese sociologists
Chinese women in politics
Living people
1954 births
People's Republic of China journalists
Writers from Chongqing
Scientists from Chongqing
Philosophers from Chongqing